Orange Line 12 (Extension), or the Kalyan-Dombivli-Taloja Line is a proposed line of Mumbai Metro. It will be an extension of Orange Line. The total length of the line is planned to be , and the route will be completely elevated. The total cost of the construction is planned to be Rs 4,132 crore. MMRDA approved the Kalyan-Dombivli-Taloja Metro line. There will be 18 stations. This line will connect Navi Mumbai city with Kalyan-Dombivali city.

Delhi Metro authority show red flag to Kalyan-Dombivli-Taloja Metro line.
However the construction work started on 01/11/2019 and is expected to be completed on 31/10/2024 with Revenue Opening Date (ROD) as 01/11/2024.
MMRDA in its 138th Authority Meeting held on 26/08/2015 vide Resolution No. 1340 has granted In-principle Approval to develop growth Centre in Kalyan Taluka (area approx. 1089 Ha.) through implementation of Town Planning Schemes (TPS).

Stations 
Line 12 will have 18 stations, all elevated.

References

Mumbai Metro lines